Dipsas variegata, the variegated snail-eater, is a snake found in South America. It is reported to feed almost exclusively on tree snails and slugs.

Dipsas trinitatis, the Trinidad snail-eater from Trinidad and Tobago, has sometimes been considered a subspecies of Dipsas variegata (Dipsas variegata trinitatis).

Reproduction
Oviparous

References

Colubrids
Dipsas
Snakes of South America
Reptiles of Bolivia
Reptiles of Brazil
Reptiles of French Guiana
Reptiles of Guyana
Reptiles of Peru
Reptiles of Suriname
Reptiles of Venezuela
Reptiles described in 1854
Taxa named by André Marie Constant Duméril
Taxa named by Gabriel Bibron
Taxa named by Auguste Duméril